An Executable Architecture (EA), in general, is the description of a system architecture (including software and/or otherwise) in a formal notation together with the tools (e.g. compilers/translators) that allow the automatic or semi-automatic generation of artifacts (e.g. capability gap analysis (CGA), models, software stubs, Military Scenario Definition Language (MSDL)) from that notation and which are used in the analysis, refinement, and/or the implementation of the architecture described.

Closely related subjects
Subjects closely related to EA include:

 Object Management Group's Model-driven architecture
 Object Management Group's Business Process Management Initiative
 Vanderbilt University's Model Integrated Computing (MIC)

Implementations
Implementations of EA include:

 Rational Rose
 Generic Modeling Environment (GME)
 Open-Source eGov Reference Architecture (OSERA)

See also
 Business Process Execution Language (BPEL)
 Business Process Management Initiative (BPMI)
 Business Process Modeling Language (BPML)
 Executable Operational Architecture
 Model-driven architecture (MDA)
 Model-driven engineering (MDE)
 Object Management Group (OMG)
 Semantic Web
 Unified Process
 Unified Modeling Language (UML)
 Vanderbilt University

References

External links

 Model Integrated Computing (MIC) Website
 OSERA's Website
 Executable Architecture of Software-Defined Enterprises

Systems engineering
Military acquisition
Military simulation